Quincy is an unincorporated community in Quincy Township in southeastern Franklin County, in the U.S. state of Pennsylvania.

History
A post office has been in operation at Quincy since 1830. Quincy originally was built up chiefly by Germans.

References

Unincorporated communities in Franklin County, Pennsylvania
Unincorporated communities in Pennsylvania